The 2021–22 Troy Trojans women's basketball team represents Troy University during the 2021–22 NCAA Division I women's basketball season. The basketball team, led by tenth-year head coach Chanda Rigby, play all home games at the Trojan Arena along with the Troy Trojans men's basketball team. They are members of the Sun Belt Conference.

As Conference champions for the second-consecutive year, the Trojans entered the Sun Belt Tournament as the No. 1 seed.

Previous season 
The Trojans finished the 2020–21 season 22–6, 15–2 in Sun Belt play to finish eastern divisional and conference tournament champions. They made it to the NCAA tournament for the first time since 2017 where they were defeated by second-seeded Texas A&M in a narrow margin of 84-80 in the first round.

Roster

Schedule and results

|-
!colspan=9 style=| Non-conference Regular Season
|-

|-
!colspan=9 style=| Conference regular season
|-

|-
!colspan=9 style=| Sun Belt Tournament

|-
!colspan=9 style=| WNIT

See also
 2021–22 Troy Trojans men's basketball team

References

Troy Trojans women's basketball seasons
Troy Trojans
Troy Trojans women's basketball
Troy Trojans women's basketball
Troy